Ron Bozman is an American film producer who won an Academy Award for Best Picture in 1991 for the film The Silence of the Lambs.

Personal life
Bozman was born in Dallas, Texas. He grew up in Garland, Texas, graduating from Garland High School in 1965. He graduated from Rice University with a Bachelor of Arts degree in psychology in 1969. He lives in New York City, with his wife Kyle McCarthy and his son Regan.

Career
Bozman broke into the film business in 1974 when he was a production manager for the film The Texas Chain Saw Massacre, a low-budget horror movie that developed a cult following.

He was a first assistant director on a string of successful movies through the 1980s, including The Muppets Take Manhattan, Something Wild and Married to the Mob. He then went on to be a full producer on Waiting for the Light (1990) and The Silence of the Lambs (1991).

In 1991, Bozman won the Academy Award for Best Picture as one of the producers of Jonathan Demme's The Silence of the Lambs—one of only three films to win all the major categories in that competition (Best Picture, Best Director, Best Screenplay, Best Actor, and Best Actress).

Two years later, Bozman was an executive producer on Philadelphia, another film directed by Demme, which won two Academy Awards.

Bozman also produced The Ref, Eddie, Beloved, For Love of the Game, Changing Lanes, The Human Stain, The Stepford Wives, Failure to Launch, Perfect Stranger, and Confessions of a Shopaholic.

References

External links
 

Film producers from Texas
Living people
People from Garland, Texas
Rice University alumni
Producers who won the Best Picture Academy Award
Year of birth missing (living people)